The Batista procedure (also called a reduction left ventriculoplasty) was an experimental heart procedure that proposed the reversal of the effects of remodeling in cases of end-stage dilated cardiomyopathy refractory to conventional medical therapy. The hypothesis of the operation appears to be that reduction (resection) of marginally viable ventricular mass may result in superior geometric remodeling thus conferring better performance when faced with ventricular failure. In spite of promising initial results, the method was soon found to be of little if any benefit, and it is no longer considered a recommended treatment for the disease.

The Batista procedure was invented by Brazilian physician and cardiac surgeon Randas Batista in 1994 for use in patients with non-ischemic dilated cardiomyopathy. Many of his patients were victims of Chagas disease. Chagas disease represents a parasitic nonischemic cardiomyopathy targeting parasympathetic inflow to the heart. Chagas cardiomyopathy thus represents a unique method of study of diastolic heart failure. It may be addressed by removal of a portion of viable tissue from the left ventricle to reduce its size (partial left ventriculectomy), with or without repair or replacement of the mitral valve.

Although several studies showed benefits from this surgery, studies at the Cleveland Clinic concluded that this procedure was associated with a high early and late failure rate. At 3 years only 26 percent were event-free and survival rate was only 60 percent. Most hospitals in the US have abandoned this operation and it is no longer included in heart failure guidelines.

References

External links
 Chapter 69: Nontransplant Surgical Options for Heart Failure by Martinus T. Spoor and Steven F. Bolling in Cardiac Surgery in the Adult]

Cardiac surgery